Adam Hansen (born 11 May 1981) is an Australian Ironman triathlete and former professional road bicycle racer, who rode professionally between 2007 and 2020, for the  and  teams.

Career
Hansen was born in Southport, Queensland, and turned professional in 2007, working with Dr. Lothar Heinrich of the University of Freiburg. In 2012, Hansen became the second Australian to complete all three Grand Tours – the Giro d'Italia, the Tour de France and the Vuelta a España – in a calendar year. He was the only rider to accomplish that feat in 2012, and the 32nd in cycling history. It was after Stage 12 of the Giro that he discovered he had broken his sternum approximately two weeks previous, however since it was healing; he continued racing. While he had free rein at the Giro, for the Tour he had work for André Greipel (to win sprints) and Jurgen Van den Broeck (to achieve a good General Classification position).

In 2013, Hansen broke away early in the seventh stage of the Giro d'Italia, a stage featuring numerous short and steep climbs. Hansen shed his breakaway companions and won in solo fashion in Pescara in pouring rain, more than a minute in advance of the chasing group. In completing the 2015 Vuelta a España, his thirteenth grand tour in a row, he broke Bernardo Ruiz's 57-year-old record for consecutive grand tours completed. By completing the 2018 Giro d'Italia, he extended his own record becoming the only rider to complete 20 consecutive Grand Tours. The streak ended at 20, as Hansen did not take part in the 2018 Tour de France.

As an engineer Hansen has designed his own shoes and ridden with them on numerous occasions. He has also written software for his  team, which manages their logistics.

After Lotto–Soudal opted not to extend Hansen's contract beyond the end of 2020, in October of that year he announced that he would focus on Ironman Triathlons in 2021, having previously competed in Ironman Florida in 2019. He ended his World Tour cycling career having finished 26 Grand Tours of the 29 he started.

In 2022, Hansen signed for Austrian Continental team WSA KTM Graz.

Personal life
He has been living in Frýdlant nad Ostravicí, Czech Republic since 2005.

Hansen is a vegan.

Major results

2004
 1st Overall Crocodile Trophy
 1st Burgenland Rundfahrt
 1st Grosser Preis um den Deutschlandsberg
2005
 1st Overall Crocodile Trophy
 1st Wien-Lassnitzhöhe
2006
 1st Grand Prix Bradlo
 1st Lavanttaler Radsporttage
 2nd Road race, National Road Championships
 2nd Salzkammergut Giro
 2nd Giro del Mendrisiotto
 10th Overall Giro della Regione Friuli Venezia Giulia
2007
 6th Le Samyn
2008
 National Road Championships
1st  Time trial
2nd Road race
 2nd Hel van het Mergelland
2009
 3rd Road race, National Road Championships
2010
 1st  Overall Ster Elektrotoer
1st Stage 4
2012
 4th Road race, National Road Championships
2013
 1st Stage 7 Giro d'Italia
2014
 1st Stage 19 Vuelta a España
 9th Overall Tour Down Under
1st  Mountains classification
 9th Overall Tour of Turkey
2015
 9th Overall Tour of Turkey
2016
 5th Overall Presidential Tour of Turkey

Grand Tour general classification results timeline

References

External links

 

1981 births
Living people
Australian male cyclists
Sportspeople from the Gold Coast, Queensland
Australian Giro d'Italia stage winners
Australian Vuelta a España stage winners
2014 Vuelta a España stage winners